The following is a list of notable events and releases of the year 1923 in Norwegian music.

Events

Deaths

 December
 31 – Olaus Andreas Grøndahl, conductor, singing teacher, and composer (born 1847).

Births

 January
 7 – Paul Weeden, American-born jazz guitarist (died 2011)
 20 – Nora Brockstedt, singer (died 2015).

 February
 2 – Sverre Bruland, trumpet player and conductor (died 2013).

 April 
 2 – Fredrik Friis, composer, lyricist, and singer (died 2008).

 June
 10 – Aase Nordmo Løvberg, opera singer (died 2013).

 July
 31 – Bjarne Nerem, jazz saxophonist and clarinetist (died 1991).

 August
 1 – Erling Stordahl, farmer and singer (died 1994).
 21 – Carsten Klouman, pianist, arranger and composer (died 2004).

See also
 1923 in Norway
 Music of Norway

References

 
Norwegian music
Norwegian
Music
1920s in Norwegian music